Claiborne County is a county located in the U.S. state of Tennessee. As of the 2020 census, the population was 32,043. Its county seat is Tazewell.

History
Claiborne County was established on October 29, 1801, created from Grainger and Hawkins counties and extended the southern boundary to Anderson County.   It was named for Virginia tidewater aristocrat William C. C. Claiborne, one of the first judges of the Tennessee Superior Court and one of the first representatives in U.S. Congress from Tennessee.

Like a few other East Tennessee counties, Claiborne County was largely opposed to secession on the eve of the Civil War.  In Tennessee's Ordinance of Secession referendum on June 8, 1861, the county's residents voted against secession by a margin of 1,243 to 250.

The Four Seasons Hotel was built on the location of present-day Lincoln Memorial University in 1892 by an English land company, the American Association Limited, which was led locally by flamboyant businessman Alexander Arthur.  At the time, it was reported by its promoters to be the largest hotel in the United States.  The main building was four stories high with a lobby 75 feet square and a dining room 50 feet by 160 feet.  It was reported to contain 700 rooms.  Also included in the complex were a hospital, an inn, a sanitarium, and other smaller buildings.  The hotel was not a success and was demolished in 1895.  During its operation, the Four Seasons Hotel offered buggy rides to nearby English Cave, which had been improved with wooden stairways, walkways, and bridges.  The rotting remains of these wooden structures can still be seen in the cave.

Notable people 
from Claiborne County include State Representative Boyd C. Fugate (1884-1967) and Tennessee's first female sheriff Della Riley. Claiborne County's musical heritage includes musicians Rodney Atkins, Cindy Morgan and Michael McMeel as well as bluegrass musicians Steve Gulley, Milton Estes, CF Bailey and Shadow Ridge, Vic Graves, Scott and Alan Powers, The Honeycutt Brothers, Buster Turner and the Turner Brothers, Bryan Turner, Patrick Beeler, Larry Carter, Randall Massengill, and Jerry Cole. Notable Old-Time musicians from Claiborne County include Fiddling Bob Rogers, as well as ballad singers Mae Ray, Alice Parsons, Chester Lewis, and Kinley Brooks, whose repertoires are included in Cecil Sharp's English Folk Songs from the Southern Appalachians. Other ballad collectors in Claiborne County include Artus Moser, C P Cambiaire, and Tillman Cadle. Local African American musicians include gospel singers Ralph Ford and Rick Gregory.

Lincoln Memorial University's literary heritage includes authors Silas House, James Still, and Jesse Stuart.

Geography

Major Waterways include the Powell River and Clinch River, which forms part of Norris Lake. Major high points are Bryson Mountain, Powell Mountain, Lone Mountain, Raven Hill, and Wallen Ridge.

Adjacent counties
Bell County, Kentucky (north)
Lee County, Virginia (northeast)
Hancock County (east)
Grainger County (southeast)
Union County (southwest)
Campbell County (west)
Whitley County, Kentucky (northwest)

National protected area
Cumberland Gap National Historical Park (part)

State protected areas
Cumberland Trail (part)
Powell River Preserve State Natural Area

Demographics

2020 census

As of the 2020 United States census, there were 32,043 people, 13,281 households, and 8,683 families residing in the county.

2000 census
As of the census of 2000, there were 29,862 people, 11,799 households, and 8,684 families residing in the county.  The population density was 69 people per square mile (27/km2).  There were 13,262 housing units at an average density of 30 per square mile (12/km2).  The racial makeup of the county was 97.79% White, 0.75% Black or African American, 0.24% Native American, 0.28% Asian, 0.01% Pacific Islander, 0.19% from other races, and 0.74% from two or more races.  0.64% of the population were Hispanic or Latino of any race.

There were 11,799 households, out of which 32.00% had children under the age of 18 living with them, 58.80% were married couples living together, 11.00% had a female householder with no husband present, and 26.40% were non-families. 23.40% of all households were made up of individuals, and 10.00% had someone living alone who was 65 years of age or older.  The average household size was 2.48 and the average family size was 2.91.

In the county, the population was spread out, with 23.60% under the age of 18, 8.90% from 18 to 24, 28.70% from 25 to 44, 25.40% from 45 to 64, and 13.40% who were 65 years of age or older.  The median age was 37 years. For every 100 females there were 93.30 males.  For every 100 females age 18 and over, there were 91.40 males.

The median income for a household in the county was $25,782, and the median income for a family was $31,234. Males had a median income of $26,280 versus $19,951 for females. The per capita income for the county was $13,032.  About 18.40% of families and 22.60% of the population were below the poverty line, including 27.70% of those under age 18 and 19.90% of those age 65 or over.

Education

 Lincoln Memorial University
 Lincoln Memorial University - DeBusk College of Osteopathic Medicine
 Walters State Community College
 http://www.claibornecountyschools.com/

Tourism 
Recent Awards and Recognition

 Received Chuck Davis award in 2013 for “Best Practices” in Tourism development.
 The Claiborne County Fair Association was awarded the 2014 “Most Improved Fair in Tennessee” by the TN State Fair Association.  
 Cumberland Gap Genealogy Jamboree and Pioneer Days was named one of the top 20 events in the Southeast for June in: 2015 and 2017 by the Southeast Tourism Society.
 The White Lightning Trail Festival was named one of the top 20 events in the Southeast for June in: 2013, 2014, and 2015 by the Southeast Tourism Society.
 The Claiborne County Fair Association was awarded the 2016 “Merit Award” by the Tennessee Department of Agriculture.  
 Cumberland Gap National Historic Park received the 2017 “Keeper of the Light Award” as part of the National Park Service Centennial celebration. 
 The Powell River Blueway Trail received the 2018 “Excellence Award” from the East Tennessee Development District. 
 The Powell River Blueway Trail received the 2018 “Excellence in Communication and Outreach Award” from the Tennessee River Basin Network.

Communities

Cities
Harrogate
New Tazewell

Towns
Cumberland Gap
Tazewell (county seat)

Unincorporated communities

Arthur
Clairfield
 Clouds
Eagan
 Goin
Hopewell
Little Sycamore
Lone Mountain
Pruden
 Reliance
Shawanee
Speedwell

Infrastructure

Transportation

U.S. Routes 25E, and State Route 63 are the major arterial roadways in the county. US 25E, established as the East Tennessee Crossing Byway and Appalachian Development Corridor S, provides four-lane expressway north-south access to Grainger County and the Kentucky-Tennessee state-line. SR 63, provides two-lane access from the city of Harrogate to Campbell County.

Politics
Claiborne County is a Republican stronghold. The last Democrat to carry this county was Bill Clinton in 1992.

See also
National Register of Historic Places listings in Claiborne County, Tennessee

References

External links

Claiborne County Chamber of Commerce
https://claibornecountytn.gov/
Claiborne County Schools
TNGenWeb Project: Claiborne County – genealogical resources

 
1801 establishments in Tennessee
Counties of Appalachia
Populated places established in 1801
Second Amendment sanctuaries in Tennessee
Tourist attractions in Claiborne County, Tennessee
East Tennessee